Ahmad Nazir is a politician from Noakhali District of Bangladesh. He was elected a member of parliament from Noakhali-7 in 1979.

Career 
Ahmad Nazir is a politician, journalist and writer. He was elected a Member of Parliament from Noakhali-7 constituency as an Bangladesh Nationalist Party candidate in the 1979 Bangladeshi general election.

References 

Living people
Year of birth missing (living people)
Bangladesh Nationalist Party politicians
2nd Jatiya Sangsad members
People from Sonaimuri Upazila